Robert John Walsh (25 June 1877 – 20 August 1910) was an Australian rules footballer who played with Carlton in the Victorian Football League (VFL).

Notes

External links 
		
Bobby Walsh's profile at Blueseum

1877 births
1910 deaths
Australian rules footballers from Bendigo
Australian Rules footballers: place kick exponents
Footscray Football Club (VFA) players
Carlton Football Club (VFA) players
Carlton Football Club players